The House of Pulcini (Italian:La casa dei pulcini) is a 1924 Italian silent film directed by Mario Camerini and starring Diomira Jacobini, Amleto Novelli and Franz Sala.

Cast
 Diomira Jacobini as Lauretta  
 Amleto Novelli as Count Landi  
 Franz Sala as Uncle  
 Giuseppe Brignone as Teacher  
 Armand Pouget as An adventurer  
 Rita D'Harcourt as The governess 
 Alex Bernard
 Felice Minotti

References

Bibliography
 Poppi, Roberto. I registi: dal 1930 ai giorni nostri. Gremese Editore, 2002.

External links

1924 films
1920s Italian-language films
Films directed by Mario Camerini
Italian silent feature films
Italian black-and-white films